A Trip in the Country is the 11th album by American country music singer-songwriter Roger Miller. It reached No. 23 in the US Country Music chart. For the sleeve notes he wrote:

"Before the days of "Dang Me", "King of the Road" and such, I was a young, ambitious song-writer walking the streets of Nashville, trying to get anybody and everybody who would to record my songs. All in all, I wrote about 150 songs for Ray Price, George Jones, Ernest Tubb and others. Some were hits, and some were not. Here are a few of the better ones. In the beginning, I created heavenly, earthly songs."

One of the songs on the album, "Tall, Tall Trees," was later recorded by Alan Jackson. The Jackson version was released as a single and became a No. 1 hit on Billboard's Hot Country Singles & Tracks chart in 1995.

Track listing
Side 1
"Tall, Tall Trees" (Roger Miller, George Jones) 2:12
"A World I Can’t Live In" (Roger Miller) 2:16
"Nothing Can Stop My Love" (Roger Miller, George Jones) 1:50
"When Two Worlds Collide" (Roger Miller, Bill Anderson) 2:08
"My Ears Should Burn (When Fools are Talked About)" (Roger Miller) 2:06
"A World So Full of Love" (Roger Miller) 2:19

Side 2
"Don’t We All Have the Right" (Roger Miller) 1:56
"That’s the Way I Feel" (Roger Miller, George Jones) 1:49
"Half a Mind" (Roger Miller) 2:45
"When a House is Not a Home" (Roger Miller) 2:26
"Invitation to the Blues" (Roger Miller) 2:32

Personnel
Harold Bradley, Ray Edenton, Charlie McCoy, Chip Young - guitar
Hargus "Pig" Robbins - piano
Bob Moore - bass
Buddy Harman - drums
Buddy Emmons - steel guitar
Tommy Jackson, Buddy Spicher - fiddle

Production
Producer: Jerry Kennedy
Engineers: Tom Sparkman & Charlie Tallent
Album Photos: Brian D. Hennssey
Album Art Direction: Des Strobel
Album Design: Wm. Falkenburg

References

1970 albums
Roger Miller albums
Mercury Records albums
Albums produced by Jerry Kennedy